Oscar Brown (19262005) is an American singer, songwriter, playwright and poet.

Oscar Brown may also refer to:

Oscar Brown Sr. (18951990), American lawyer, businessman and community activist 
Oscar Brown (baseball) (19462020), American baseball outfielder